Iguaçu or Iguazú may refer to:

Inhabited places
Puerto Iguazú, Argentina
Foz do Iguaçu, Paraná, Brazil
Nova Iguaçu, Rio de Janeiro, Brazil
Nova Iguaçu de Goiás, Goiás, Brazil
Iguaçu Territory, a former Brazilian federal territory

Rivers
Iguazu River, a river in Brazil and Argentina
Iguazu Falls, on the Iguazu River

Other uses
Iguaçu, a 1977 album by Passport
1684 Iguassú, a main belt asteroid
Iguaçu National Park (Brazil)
Iguazú National Park (Argentina)